The 1937 Tour de Suisse was the fifth edition of the Tour de Suisse cycle race and was held from 31 July to 7 August 1937. The race started and finished in Zürich. The race was won by Karl Litschi.

General classification

References

1937
Tour de Suisse